Robert Lewis Taylor (September 24, 1912 – September 30, 1998) was an American writer and winner of the 1959 Pulitzer Prize for Fiction.

Education 
Born in Carbondale, Illinois, Taylor attended Southern Illinois University for one year. The university now houses his papers. He graduated from the University of Illinois at Urbana-Champaign with a bachelor of arts in 1933.

Career 
After college, he became a journalist and won awards for reporting. In 1939, he became a writer for The New Yorker magazine, contributing biographical sketches. His work also appeared in The Saturday Evening Post and Reader's Digest.

From 1942 to 1946, Taylor served in the United States Navy during World War II. During his service, he wrote numerous stories and Adrift in a Boneyard, an extended fiction about survivors of a disaster.  In 1949,The Saturday Evening Post commissioned a series of biographical sketches of W. C. Fields.  He published them together as W. C. Fields: His Follies and Fortunes. Taylor continued to write fiction and biographies, including one on Winston Churchill.

Taylor's 1958 novel The Travels of Jaimie McPheeters, about a 14-year-old and his father in the California Gold Rush, won the Pulitzer Prize and was purchased for a film, but eventually became a television series, instead. A Journey to Matecumbe was adapted in 1976 as the Disney movie Treasure of Matecumbe.  His novel Professor Fodorski served as the basis for the 1962 musical All American.

Taylor died on September 30, 1998.

Bibliography 
Adrift in a Boneyard (1948)
 Doctor, Lawyer, Merchant, Chief (1948)
 W. C. Fields: His Follies and Fortunes (1949)
 Professor Fodorski (1950)
 The Running Pianist (1950)
 Winston Churchill: An Informal Study of Greatness (1952)
 The Bright Sands (1954)
 The Travels of Jaimie McPheeters (1958)
 Center Ring (1960)
 A Journey to Matecumbe (1961)
 Two Roads to Guadalupe (1964)
 Vessel of Wrath: The Life and Times of Carry Nation (1966)
 A Roaring in the Wind (1978)
 Niagara (1980)

References

External links
Robert Lewis Taylor Papers, 1947–1968, at Southern Illinois University, Carbondale, Special Collections Research Center

1912 births
1998 deaths
Pulitzer Prize for Fiction winners
United States Navy personnel of World War II
University of Illinois Urbana-Champaign alumni
People from Carbondale, Illinois
Novelists from Illinois
The New Yorker staff writers
20th-century American novelists
American male novelists
Journalists from Illinois
20th-century American male writers
20th-century American non-fiction writers
American male non-fiction writers
20th-century American journalists
American male journalists